Agneta Lundberg (born 1947), is a Swedish social democratic politician. She was a member of the Riksdag from 1994 to 2010.

References

1947 births
Living people
Members of the Riksdag from the Social Democrats
Women members of the Riksdag
21st-century Swedish women politicians
Members of the Riksdag 2002–2006
Members of the Riksdag 1994–1998
Members of the Riksdag 1998–2002
Members of the Riksdag 2006–2010